Pseudorhodoplanes  is a genus of bacteria.

References

Nitrobacteraceae
Bacteria genera